What the World Needs Now Is Love is the third album by American recording gospel/soul female group the Sweet Inspirations released in 1968 on the label Atlantic Records. The album was produced by Tom Dowd and arranged by Arif Mardin. It features their cover versions of the classic songs; "Alfie", "Unchained Melody", "What the World Needs Now Is Love" and the Bee Gees' "To Love Somebody".

The group's album scored two R&B hit singles; "To Love Somebody" peaked No. 30 and "Unchained Melody" which peaked No. 41 on the Billboard Hot Rhythm & Blues Singles chart. The album also includes three songs written by the group's lead vocalist Cissy Houston; for songs "I Could Leave You Alone", "You Really Didn't Mean It", and "Where Did It Go".

Track listing
Side A
1."Alfie" - 3:19

2."What the World Needs Now Is Love" - 2:58

3."To Love Somebody" - 2:42

4."Watch the One Who Brings You the News" - 2:38

5."Am I Ever Gonna See My Baby Again" - 2:55

6."Unchained Melody" - 3:25

Side B
7."You Really Didn't Mean It" - 2:58

8."Just Walk in My Shoes" - 2:21

9."Where Did It Go" - 2:41 

10."I Could Leave You Alone" - 2:16

11."That's How Strong My Love Is" - 2:13

12."I Don't Want to Go on Without You" - 2:57

Personnel
Arranged by Arif Mardin
Producer, Engineer - Tom Dowd
Supervised by Jerry Wexler

Charts

Singles

References

External links
Sweet Inspirations: What the World Needs Now is Love (LP Album)

1968 albums
Sweet Inspirations albums
Albums arranged by Arif Mardin
Albums produced by Tom Dowd
Atlantic Records albums